Hill–Grainger Historic District, also known as the North Queen Street Area, is a national historic district located at Kinston, Lenoir County, North Carolina, USA. It encompasses 172 contributing buildings in a predominantly residential section of Kinston.  The buildings include notable examples of Queen Anne, Colonial Revival, Tudor Revival and Bungalow / American Craftsman style architecture and date between 1900 and 1941. Notable buildings include the (former) Grainger High School, Sarahurst (1902-1904), Vernon Hall (1913-1914), (second) H. C. Hines House (1929), Canady-Sutton House (c. 1925), Hobgood-Sparrow House (1926), (first) H. C. Hines House (c. 1917), and the Fields Rasberry House.

It was listed on the National Register of Historic Places in 1989.

References

Historic districts on the National Register of Historic Places in North Carolina
Colonial Revival architecture in North Carolina
Tudor Revival architecture in North Carolina
Queen Anne architecture in North Carolina
Buildings and structures in Lenoir County, North Carolina
National Register of Historic Places in Lenoir County, North Carolina